The Alain Gilles Trophy (French: Trophée Alain Gilles) is an annual basketball award that is given to the French Basketball Player of the Year (which can be either male or female), in a given season, regardless of the country that they play club basketball in. The award is named after Alain Gilles, who played in 159 games with the senior men's French national basketball team, and who is considered to be one of the greatest French basketball players of all time. Voters for the winner of the award include French Basketball Federation (FFBB) members, men's and women's French senior national team veterans, and French sports media representatives.

Winners

References

External links
Trophée Alain Gilles 
Rudy Gobert named French Player of the Year

Basketball in France
European basketball awards